Current is an American media platform.

History
The company was founded by CEO Dan Novaes, Nick McEvily, and Kiran Panesar in 2016.

Platform
On the Current platform users receive digital tokens called CRNC, which can be exchanged for goods or services on the Current platform, which uses the Ethereum blockchain. According to Novaes, this decentralizes the monetization of data from large corporations to the individuals from which the data is coming from. It has partnered with Spotify and Apple Music.

References

2016 establishments in the United States
Streaming software